This is a list of women artists who were born in Algeria or whose artwork is closely associated with that country.

B
Baya (1931–1998), painter, ceramist
Souhila Belbahar (born 1934). painter
Myriam Ben (1928–2001), writer, painter
Zaida Ben-Yusuf (1869–1933), photographer
Nadia Benbouta (born 1970), artist, combines unrelated elements
Zohra Bensemra (born 1968), photographer
Samta Benyahia (born 1950), plastic artist
Zoulikha Bouabdellah (born 1977), plastic artist, videographer
Feriel Boushaki (born 1986), plastic artist

H
Mimi Hafida (active since 2010), poet, visual artist
Bettina Heinen-Ayech (1937–2020), painter

N

Houria Niati (born 1948), installation artist

O
Lydia Ourahmane (born 1992), visual and sound artist

S
Zineb Sedira (born 1963), photographer and video artist

Z
Fatma Zohra Zamoum (born 1967), writer, filmmaker and educator
Amina Zoubir (born 1983), contemporary artist, filmmaker

References

-
-
Algerian women artists, List of
artists
Artists